The Ettrick Water is a river in Ettrick, by the village of Ettrickbridge and the historic town of Selkirk, in the Scottish Borders area of Scotland.

The water, a tributary of the River Tweed, is known also as the River Ettrick, often locally known as Wild Ettrick (though that title refers more correctly to the Ettrick Forest and the Ettrickdale), and it flows through the village, and its flood plain, the Ettrick Marshes. It is the second-fastest rising river in Scotland.

See also
Rivers of Scotland
List of places in the Scottish Borders
 Map sources for:  - source on Wind Fell / Loch Fell and  - confluence with the River Tweed near Sunderland Hall, Lindean.

Tributaries of the River Tweed
Rivers of the Scottish Borders
1EttrickWater